Barclay Augustus Robertson (29 August 1883 – 10 March 1905) was an Australian rules footballer who played with St Kilda in the Victorian Football League (VFL).

References

External links 

1883 births
1905 deaths
Australian rules footballers from Melbourne
St Kilda Football Club players
People from Prahran, Victoria